The JW Hunt Cup is an annual charity football competition for teams based in the West Midlands area of England.

The defending champions are Lye Town, who defeated Boldmere St. Michaels 2–1 in the 2021–22 final.

History 
The JW Hunt Cup was formed in 1926 to raise funds for the benefit of the local blind. It is named in memory of John William Hunt, a local businessman, keen supporter of charities and founder of the Chillington Tool Company.

The inaugural winners at the end of the 1926–27 season were Short Heath United, beating Cannon Iron on 14 April 1927 at Molineux. Short Heath United are the joint most successful club in the competition alongside Goodyear F.C, with both clubs having won on four occasions. Other successful clubs in the competition include Richmond Swifts and Great Wyrley.

The 2021–22 tournament set a then-record for the longest penalty shootout in British football history, as AFC Wulfrunians defeated Lane Head after 44 penalty kicks. The record was broken a few months later by Washington and Bedlington Terriers with 54 penalty kicks.

Charity 
The cup aims to raise money for local blind charities, raising over £360,000 since its formation in 1926. In 2018, the cup committee presented a cheque worth £10,000 to the Beacon Centre for the blind.

JW Hunt Cup winners

References

External links
JW Hunt Cup

Football cup competitions in England
Recurring sporting events established in 1926
1926 establishments in England